The Woman They Talk About (German: Die Frau von der man spricht) is a 1931 German drama film directed by Victor Janson and starring Mady Christians, Hans Stüwe and Lilian Ellis. The film's art direction was by Botho Hoefer and Bernhard Schwidewski. It is based on the play Daniel by Louis Verneuil.

Cast
 Mady Christians as Vera Moretti  
 Hans Stüwe as René Bennett  
 Lilian Ellis as Dina Kent 
 S.Z. Sakall as Salewski Moretti
 Otto Wallburg as Greven  
 Carl Goetz as Dr. Wilson  
 Ernst Dernburg as   Mr. Bennett  
 Alexander Sascha as Marquis von Kent  
 Frank Günther as Severac  
 Kitty Meinhardt as Louise  
 Harry Nestor as Chauffeur Robert

References

Bibliography 
 Waldman, Harry. Nazi Films in America, 1933-1942. McFarland, 2008.

External links 
 

1931 films
1931 drama films
Films of the Weimar Republic
German drama films
1930s German-language films
Films based on works by Louis Verneuil
Films directed by Victor Janson
German black-and-white films
1930s German films